Erdoğdu is a village in the Tunceli District, Tunceli Province, Turkey. The village is populated by Kurds of the Kurêşan tribe and had a population of 18 in 2021.

The hamlets of Bardak, Bardakkale and Yeşilce are attached to the village.

References 

Villages in Tunceli District
Kurdish settlements in Tunceli Province